Madame Dares an Escapade (German: Madame wagt einen Seitensprung) is a 1927 German silent film directed by Hans Otto and starring Xenia Desni, Livio Pavanelli and Carmen Cartellieri. It was shot in Vienna.

Cast
 Xenia Desni as Frau Claire
 Livio Pavanelli as Herr Anatol Huber
 Hermann Thimig as Fred - His Friend 
 Betty Bird as Pia - Anatol's Girlfriend 
 Carmen Cartellieri as Lo - Fred's Girlfriend 
 Hans Moser as Train passenger

References

Bibliography
 Bock, Hans-Michael & Bergfelder, Tim. The Concise CineGraph. Encyclopedia of German Cinema. Berghahn Books, 2009.

External links

1927 films
Films of the Weimar Republic
Films directed by Hans Otto
German silent feature films
German black-and-white films
Adultery in films